Suomen Neito was a traditional Finnish beauty pageant that was organized in the 1950s and 1960s, 1986 and from 1990 to 2007. In 1952, Armi Kuusela was crowned as the first Suomen Neito, which qualified her into the first-ever Miss Universe pageant, becoming its first titleholder. Between 1986 and 2006, the winners took part in the Miss World pageant. The 2007 representative was selected in a new pageant, which reduced the value of Suomen Neito and it was disbanded.

In 1962 and 1991, the Suomen Neito pageants were held in conjunction with the Miss Finland pageant. Miss Finland (Finnish: Miss Suomi), organized since 1931, is the oldest and most well-known beauty pageant in Finland.

Titleholders

See also
 Miss Finland

References

Finland
Beauty pageants in Finland
Finnish awards
Women in Finland
1952 establishments in Finland